The Vuelta a Bolivia is the most important road bicycle race in the State of Bolivia. The first edition of the race, in 2008, replaced an historical Bolivian race, the "Doble Copacabana de Ciclismo". It is now organized as a 2.2 event on the UCI America Tour.

Winners

External links

UCI America Tour races
Cycle races in Bolivia
Recurring sporting events established in 2008
2008 establishments in Bolivia
Spring (season) events in Bolivia
Recurring sporting events disestablished in 2013
2013 disestablishments in Bolivia
Defunct cycling races in Bolivia